The art collection of the Foundation of Lucca Saving Bank (in Italian Fondazione Cassa di Risparmio di Lucca) is a collection of artworks, mostly created by artists from Lucca, acquired by this financial institution (the bank became two entity in 1990s, SpA and Bank Foundation). The home of the Foundation is the former Monastery and church of San Micheletto in Lucca. Though artworks of many periods are present in the collection, the Baroque paintings and the items linked to the cult of the Holy Face of Lucca are especially of note.

Partial inventory of the collection

External links
 Homepage of the Foundation with images of the artworks.

Art museums and galleries in Tuscany
Museums in Lucca
Fondazione Cassa di Risparmio di Lucca